David Angeli from the Imperial College London, UK was named Fellow of the Institute of Electrical and Electronics Engineers (IEEE) in 2015 for contributions to nonlinear control theory.

References

External links

20th-century births
Living people
Fellow Members of the IEEE
Year of birth missing (living people)
Place of birth missing (living people)